Scourfieldia is a genus of green algae in the family Scourfieldiaceae.  Cardiomona Korshikov is an invalid synonym.

The genus was circumscribed by George Stephen West in J. Bot. vol.50 on page 326 in 1912.

The genus name of Scourfieldia is in honour of David Joseph Scourfield FLS FRMS ISO (1866–1949), who was a British civil servant and biologist known as an authority on the Cladocera.

Species
Scourfieldia contains the following species:
 Scourfieldia caeca (Korshikov) J.H.Belcher & Swale, 1963
 Scourfieldia complanata G. S. West, 1912
 Scourfieldia cordiformis Takeda, 1916

WoRMS also accepts; 
 Scourfieldia chlorolateralis 
 Scourfieldia conica 
 Scourfieldia ovata 
 Scourfieldia quadrata 

Former species;
 Scourfieldia magnopyrenoidea]]  accepted as (synonym of) Scourfieldia caeca 
 Scourfieldia marina  accepted as (Synonym of) Pseudoscourfieldia marina

References

External links

Chlorophyta genera
Pedinophyceae